Panasonic Lumix DMC-LS5 is a digital camera by Panasonic Lumix. The highest-resolution pictures it records is 14.1 megapixels, through its 26mm Ultra Wide-Angle.

Property
HD Movie Recording: 1,280 x 720 pixels, 30 fps
Continuous shooting mode: full-resolution image, 0.8 frames/sec

References

External links
DMC-LS5K on shop.panasonic.com
Panasonic Lumix DMC-LS5 digital camera

Bridge digital cameras
LS5